Eupithecia puengeleri is a moth in the family Geometridae. It is found in Russia.

References

Moths described in 1913
puengeleri
Moths of Asia